The Wood–Ljungdahl pathway is a set of biochemical reactions used by some bacteria. It is also known as the reductive acetyl-coenzyme A (Acetyl-CoA) pathway.  This pathway enables these organisms to use hydrogen as an electron donor, and carbon dioxide as an electron acceptor and as a building block for biosynthesis.

In this pathway carbon dioxide is reduced to carbon monoxide and formic acid or directly into a formyl group, the formyl group is reduced to a methyl group and then combined with the carbon monoxide and Coenzyme A to produce acetyl-CoA.  Two specific enzymes participate on the carbon monoxide side of the pathway: CO Dehydrogenase and acetyl-CoA synthase.  The former catalyzes the reduction of the CO2 and the latter combines the resulting CO with a methyl group to give acetyl-CoA.

Some anaerobic bacteria use the Wood–Ljungdahl pathway in reverse to break down acetate. For example, Sulfate reducing bacteria oxidize acetate completely to CO2 and H2 coupled with the reduction of sulfate to sulfide. When operating in the reverse direction, the acetyl-CoA synthase is sometimes called acetyl-CoA decarbonylase.

Not to be confused with the Wood-Ljungdahl pathway, an evolutionarily related but biochemically distinct pathway named the Wolfe Cycle occurs exclusively in some methanogenic archaea called methanogens. In these anaerobic archaea, the Wolfe Cycle functions as a methanogenesis pathway to reduce CO2 into methane with electron donors such as hydrogen and formate. Similar to the Reverse Krebs cycle and the Calvin cycle, the Wolfe Cycle is cyclic, but the Wood-Ljungdahl pathway is not.

Evolution

Last universal common ancestor 
A 2016 study of the genomes of a set of bacteria and archaea suggested that the last universal common ancestor (LUCA) of all cells was using an ancient Wood–Ljungdahl pathway in a hydrothermal setting, but more recent work challenges this conclusion. Phylometabolic reconstructions also support this. However, recent experiments have tried to replicate this pathway by attempting to reduce CO2, with very little pyruvate observed using native iron as a reducing agent (<0.03 mM), and even less so under hydrothermal settings with H2 (10 μM).

See also
 Carbon fixation
 Carbon monoxide dehydrogenase
 Syngas fermentation
 Methanogenesis

References

Other reading

  
  

Metabolic pathways